Wired is the third solo album by the British guitarist Jeff Beck, released on Epic Records in 1976. An instrumental album, it peaked at No. 16 on the Billboard 200 and was certified platinum by the RIAA.

Background and content
Of the album tracks, four are originals by Narada Michael Walden and one by Jan Hammer. Max Middleton contributed the homage to Led Zeppelin, "Led Boots", and Beck chose to interpret the Charles Mingus ode to saxophonist Lester Young, "Goodbye Pork Pie Hat", from the classic 1959 jazz album Mingus Ah Um. These last two tracks were long-time staples of Beck's performance repertoire.

Reception

Wired received mostly positive reviews when it was released. In Rolling Stone, the reviewer cited it as being full of "fire and imagination". However, Robert Christgau faulted it as technically proficient but soulless, calling it "mindless trickery". Engineer Peter Henderson later said of the album, "I listened to that a few years later and it sounded like it had been recorded direct to cassette. I don't think it was one of my finer moments."

Writing for AllMusic, Mark Kirschenmann said, "Within a two-year span, the twin towers Blow by Blow and Wired set a standard for instrumental rock that even Beck has found difficult to match. On Wired, with first-rate material and collaborators on hand, one of rock's most compelling guitarists is in top form."

The album peaked at No. 16 on the Billboard 200 in August 1976, spending a total of 25 weeks on the chart. In the UK it spent five weeks on the chart and reached No. 35. The album has been certified platinum by the RIAA.

Release history
In addition to the conventional two channel stereo version the album was also released by Epic in 1976 in a four channel quadraphonic edition on LP record and 8-track tape. The quad LP release was encoded in the SQ matrix system.

The album was first released on CD in 1985 in Japan. In 2001 a remastered stereo edition of the CD was reissued internationally. 

The album was reissued in stereo in the United States on the hybrid Super Audio CD format in 2016 by Analogue Productions. The same year it was also reissued by Epic in Japan as a hybrid multichannel SACD. The Japanese SACD version has the entire stereo album, but also adds the complete quad album on the same disc adapted for 5.1 surround sound. This marks the first time that the quad version has been reissued in a digital format.

Track listing

* Note: "Head for Backstage Pass" is incorrectly listed as being 3:45 on some LP centres; 2:42 is correct.

Personnel
 Jeff Beck – guitars
 Max Middleton – Hohner clavinet, Fender Rhodes electric piano
 Jan Hammer – synthesizer (on "Led Boots", "Come Dancing", "Blue Wind" and "Play with Me"), drums (on "Blue Wind")
 Wilbur Bascomb – bass (except on "Blue Wind")
 Narada Michael Walden – drums (on "Led Boots", "Come Dancing", "Sophie", "Head for Backstage Pass" and "Play with Me"), piano (on "Love Is Green")
 Richard Bailey – drums (on "Goodbye Pork Pie Hat" and "Head for Backstage Pass")
 Ed Greene – second drum kit (on "Come Dancing")

Additional personnel
 George Martin – producer
 Chris Bond – assistant producer
 Jan Hammer – producer on "Blue Wind"
 Pete Henderson, Dennis McKay, John Mills, John Arias – engineers
 Geoff Emerick – mixing engineer
 Bruce Dickinson – reissue producer

References

External links 
 Jeff Beck - Wired (1976) album review by Mark Kirschenmann, credits & releases at AllMusic
 Jeff Beck - Wired (1976) album releases & credits at Discogs
 Jeff Beck - Wired (1976) album credits & user reviews at ProgArchives.com
 Jeff Beck - Wired (1976) album to be listened as stream on Spotify
 

Jeff Beck albums
Jazz fusion albums by English artists
1976 albums
Epic Records albums
Albums produced by George Martin